Veterans United Home Loans is a full service mortgage lender headquartered in Columbia, Missouri. The company has 28 offices nationwide and is licensed in all 50 states. The company primarily originates VA loans, a mortgage product guaranteed by the U.S. Department of Veterans Affairs.

Veterans United is the largest VA lender in the nation, financing $12.82 billion in total VA loan volume for 2019, up from $10.44 billion in 2018.

History 
Veterans United Home Loans was founded in 2002 by brothers Brant and Brock Bukowsky. In 2003, the company named Nathan Long as CEO. 

In 2007, Inc. magazine put the company at No. 96 on its list of the 500 fastest-growing private companies based on its three-year sales growth of 1,553.3 percent and loan volume of $10.2 million.

In November 2011, Veterans United launched a 501(c)(3) charitable entity, Veterans United Foundation. A year later Inc. magazine named Veterans United the No. 29 top job creator in the country in 2012.

Veterans United financed $4.1 billion in 2013, accounting for 3% of the VA's total loan volume. The company held 4.4% of the VA loan market share in 2014.

In January 2016, the Virginia Beach Amphitheater announced a 4-year naming rights agreement with Veterans United to rename the venue to The Veterans United Home Loans Amphitheater.

In 2020, Veterans United was named to Fortune Magazine's 100 Best Companies to Work For list for the fifth consecutive year - ranking number 17 overall. Veterans United ranked No. 23 in 2019, No. 32 in 2018, No. 27 in 2017 and No. 30 in 2016.

Financial growth

See also 
 Veterans United Home Loans Amphitheater

References 

Mortgage lenders of the United States
American companies established in 2002
Financial services companies established in 2002
Companies based in Columbia, Missouri
2002 establishments in Missouri